Puni is a rural locality in the Franklin ward of Auckland in the North Island of New Zealand.  It is predominantly a dairy farming and market gardening area.  The main type of crops grown are potatoes, carrots, and onions.

Puni is located between the larger towns of Pukekohe and Waiuku.

Demographics

Puni had a population of 1,593 at the 2018 New Zealand census, an increase of 63 people (4.1%) since the 2013 census, and an increase of 132 people (9.0%) since the 2006 census. There were 480 households, comprising 831 males and 765 females, giving a sex ratio of 1.09 males per female. The median age was 41.0 years (compared with 37.4 years nationally), with 321 people (20.2%) aged under 15 years, 315 (19.8%) aged 15 to 29, 723 (45.4%) aged 30 to 64, and 234 (14.7%) aged 65 or older.

Ethnicities were 75.7% European/Pākehā, 13.4% Māori, 5.5% Pacific peoples, 14.9% Asian, and 2.4% other ethnicities. People may identify with more than one ethnicity.

The percentage of people born overseas was 18.8, compared with 27.1% nationally.

Although some people chose not to answer the census's question about religious affiliation, 51.0% had no religion, 36.2% were Christian, 1.5% had Māori religious beliefs, 3.2% were Hindu, 0.4% were Muslim, 0.6% were Buddhist and 2.6% had other religions.

Of those at least 15 years old, 186 (14.6%) people had a bachelor's or higher degree, and 246 (19.3%) people had no formal qualifications. The median income was $36,100, compared with $31,800 nationally. 249 people (19.6%) earned over $70,000 compared to 17.2% nationally. The employment status of those at least 15 was that 732 (57.5%) people were employed full-time, 201 (15.8%) were part-time, and 27 (2.1%) were unemployed.

Education
The school was founded in 1878.

It is a little more than 4 km northwest of Puni School, and was opened in 1883.

Both schools are coeducational.

References

Populated places in the Auckland Region